The Limbourg brothers (fl. 1385 – 1416) were famous  
Dutch miniature painters (Herman, Paul, and Johan) from the city of Nijmegen. They were active in the early 15th century in France and Burgundy, working in the style known as International Gothic. They created what is certainly the best-known late medieval illuminated manuscript, the Très Riches Heures du Duc de Berry.

Uncle Malouel 
Around 1398, after their father's death, the brothers were sent for by their uncle Jean Malouel (or Johan Maelwael, Jehan Maleuel in original French sources), the most important painter for the French and Burgundian courts of the time.  Herman and Johan learned the craft of goldsmithing in Paris.  At the end of 1399 they were travelling to visit Nijmegen but, owing to a war, they were captured in Brussels. Since their mother could not pay the ransom of 55 gold escuz, the local goldsmiths' guild started to collect the money. Eventually Philip the Bold paid the ransom for the sake of their uncle Malouel, his painter. The two boys were released in May 1400.

Work on the Bible
From surviving documents it is known that in February 1402 Paul and Johan were contracted by Philip to work for four years exclusively on illuminating a bible.  This may or may not have been the Bible Moralisée ( 166 in the Bibliothèque nationale de France in Paris), which is indisputably an early work by the Limbourg brothers.  Philip II died in 1404 before the brothers had completed their work.

Jean de Berry

After Philip's death, Herman, Paul, and Johan later in 1405 came to work for his brother John, Duke of Berry, who was an extravagant collector of arts and especially books.  Their first assignment was to illuminate a Book of Hours, now known as the Belles Heures du Duc de Berry; held in The Cloisters of the Metropolitan Museum of Art in New York City.

This work was finished in 1409 much to the satisfaction of the duke, and he assigned them to an even more ambitious project for a book of hours.  This became the Très Riches Heures du Duc de Berry, which is widely regarded as the peak of late medieval book illumination, and possibly the most valuable book in the world.  It is kept as  65 in the Musée Condé in Chantilly, France.

Paul especially was on good terms with the duke, and received a court position as valet de chambre, or personal attendant (his uncle had had the same position with the duke of Burgundy).  The duke gave him jewelry and a large house in Bourges.  Paul was attracted to a young girl, Gillette la Mercière, but her parents disapproved.  The duke had the girl confined, and released her only on the king's command.  In 1411 Paul and Gillette married anyway, but the marriage remained childless (the girl was 12, her husband 24 at the time).

Death
In the first half of 1416, Jean de Berry and the three Limbourg brothers – all less than 30 years old – died, possibly of the plague, leaving the Très Riches Heures unfinished.  An unidentified artist (possibly Barthélemy van Eyck) worked on the famous calendar miniatures in the 1440s when the book apparently was in the possession of René d'Anjou, and in 1485 Jean Colombe finished the work for the House of Savoy.

The work of the Limbourg brothers, being mostly inaccessible, became forgotten until the 19th century.  Nevertheless, they set an example for the next generations of painters, which extended beyond miniature painting.  They worked in a Northern European tradition, but display influences from Italian models. Among their own sources of artistic inspiration was the work of the Master of the Brussels Initials.

References 

 Rob Dückers and Pieter Roelofs (eds.), The brothers van Limburg.  Exhibition catalogue, Ludion, Nijmegen 2005.  
 Husband, Timothy B., The Art of Illumination: The Limbourg Brothers and the Belles Heures of Jean de France, Duc de Berry. The Metropolitan Museum of Art/Yale University Press, 2008.

External links 

 Website of the 2005 exhibition in Nijmegen
 Website of the annual medieval festival dedicated to the Limbourg brothers in Nijmegen
 Limbourg brothers last Illuminators of the Medieval Art

1416 deaths
Gothic painters
Early Netherlandish painters
People from Nijmegen
Arts in the court of Philip the Good
Artist families
Sibling trios
Year of birth unknown
Manuscript illuminators
15th-century deaths from plague (disease)